Louie Ramirez (February 24, 1938 – June 7, 1993) was an American boogaloo, salsa and latin jazz percussionist, vibraphonist, band leader and composer. He co-wrote with Johnny Pacheco the 1961 hit "El Güiro De Macorina". He has been called "the Quincy Jones of Salsa."

Biography
Ramirez was born in Manhattan, New York City, United States. He made his professional debut with Joe Loco's band in 1956, replacing vibraphonist Pete Terrace. Ramirez made his own debut as a bandleader in 1963, with Introducing Louie Ramirez (Rmo Records). He subsequently recorded for Alegre, Fania, Atco, United Artists Records, Caiman, FNA and RMM Records & Video.

He partnered with Charlie Palmieri and Joe Cuba from 1965 to 1968. With Tito Rodriguez he released the LP Tito Rodríguez y Louie Ramírez En Algo Nuevo in 1972. He became a staff producer at Fania in 1975. He appeared as a sideman or a production assistant on many recordings by other artists, such as Willie Colón, in the 1970s.

On June 7, 1993, while driving along Junction Boulevard in Queens, New York, Ramirez suffered a fatal heart attack, at the age of 55. He was recording his third album with the singer Ray De La Paz. It was entitled Preparate Bailador.

References

External links

Louie Ramirez at Vinilemania

1938 births
1993 deaths
American jazz vibraphonists
Latin jazz musicians
Salsa musicians
Musicians from New York City
Fania Records artists
20th-century American musicians
Jazz musicians from New York (state)